Tawanda Blessings Chiwira (born 27 August 1974) is a Zimbabwean sprinter who specialized in the 400 metres.

Chiwira finished seventh in 4 x 400 metres relay at the 1997 World Championships, together with teammates Phillip Mukomana, Savieri Ngidhi and Ken Harnden. The team set a Zimbabwean record of 3:00.79 minutes during the heats.

External links
sports-reference

1974 births
Living people
Zimbabwean male sprinters
Athletes (track and field) at the 1996 Summer Olympics
Athletes (track and field) at the 2000 Summer Olympics
Olympic athletes of Zimbabwe
Athletes (track and field) at the 1998 Commonwealth Games
Athletes (track and field) at the 2002 Commonwealth Games
Commonwealth Games competitors for Zimbabwe
World Athletics Championships athletes for Zimbabwe